Karim Eddafi is a Moroccan footballer who plays for Sudanese club El-Merreikh in the Sudan Premier League. He plays as a winger.  He was brought to EL-Merreikh from Moroccan side Kentira AC in January 2010.

References

Moroccan footballers
Moroccan expatriate footballers
Association football wingers
Living people
Year of birth missing (living people)
Al-Merrikh SC players
Al-Hazem F.C. players